Temple architecture may refer to:

 Hindu temple architecture
 Temple architecture (LDS Church)